Open Our Eyes is the fifth studio album by American band Earth, Wind & Fire, released on March 25, 1974 on Columbia Records. The album rose to No. 1 on the Billboard Top Soul Albums chart and No. 15 on the Top Pop Albums chart.
Open Our Eyes has been certified Platinum in the US by the RIAA.

Overview
Open Our Eyes was produced by Maurice White and Joe Wissert and recorded at Caribou Ranch in Nederland, Colorado, US. During 2001, Open Our Eyes was reissued with four bonus tracks.

Singles
The track, "Mighty Mighty", peaked at No. 4 on the Billboard Hot Soul Songs chart and No. 29 on the Billboard Hot 100 chart. "Kalimba Story" reached No. 6 on the Billboard Hot Soul Songs chart. Another single, "Devotion", peaked at No. 23 on the Billboard Hot Soul Songs chart and No. 33 on the Billboard Hot 100 chart.

Critical reception

Rolling Stone called Open Our Eyes "a pleasant miscellany of Africana, Latin rhythms, well-mannered funk, smooth jazz, Sly Stone, Stevie Wonder and the Fifth Dimension". The Village Voice's Robert Christgau also described Side 1 as "A very pleasant surprise" and Side 2 as a complete "tour de force".

Music journalist Vince Aletti named Open Our Eyes in his ballot for The Village Voice's 1974 Pazz & Jop critics poll.

Track listing

Original release

2001 Reissue

Personnel
Philip Bailey - vocals, congas, percussion
Larry Dunn - Moog synthesizer, piano, organ
Johnny Graham - guitar, percussion
Ralph Johnson - drums, percussion
Al McKay - vocals, guitar, percussion
Maurice White - vocals, drums, kalimba
Verdine White - vocals, bass, percussion
Andrew Woolfolk - soprano saxophone, flute

Production
Earth, Wind & Fire - Musical arrangements
Maurice White - Producer (Original recording), Audio Mixing (12-15)
Bruce Botnick - Recording Engineer, Remix
Paul Klingberg - Audio Mixing (12-15)
Leo Sacks - Producer (Reissue), Audio Mixing (12-15)
Charles Stepney - Associate Producer (Original recording), Musical arrangements
Joe Wissert - Producer (Original recording)

Charts and Certifications

Weekly charts

Year-end charts

Certifications

See also
List of number-one R&B albums of 1974 (U.S.)

References

Earth, Wind & Fire albums
1974 albums
Albums produced by Maurice White
Albums produced by Joe Wissert
Columbia Records albums